Lysterfield (Boonwurrung: Waralk-warrabin) is a suburb in Melbourne, Victoria, Australia, 32 km south-east of Melbourne's Central Business District, located within the City of Knox and the Shire of Yarra Ranges local government areas.

History

The area around Lysterfield was first settled in 1838. Initially it was part of Narre Warren, but was named Lysterfield in 1874 when land was set aside for a primary school. At this time, Lysterfield included what is now Rowville. The land was primarily used for farming.

Lysterfield Road is one of the major blackspots in Victoria. When the Victorian State Government fixed it, it cost $2.3m. Further along that road is the City of Knox Avenue of honour, which was first planted in 1918–19 in recognition of First World War veterans. This is a group of pine trees.

A well-known attraction in Lysterfield is the Lysterfield Lake, built in 1929 by the State Rivers & Water Supply Commission, to supply water to the Mornington Peninsula, Springvale, and Dandenong. Lysterfield Lake Park was established as a water catchment area surrounding the lake. Today, there are facilities for sailing, swimming, canoeing, mountain biking and walking. It is one-third in the City of Knox, the rest being in the Shire of Yarra Ranges and a small part in the City of Casey. This park includes a few ruins such as the Donlane and the Dargon homestead site, still with its surrounding orchards and the ruins of the dairy that is renowned as Boy's Farm.

In February 2009 bushfires affected this area; homes were threatened but none were lost.

Agriculture

Lysterfield is also a place where people raise alpacas, and grow many vegetables, including a large sprout farm. The centre of Lysterfield reflects its rural status, with a farm shop and a petrol station, which is advertised as 'prime land'.

Lysterfield is home to the Salesians of Don Bosco Auxilium College, numerous equestrian trails and horse riding schools, the Lysterfield Christian Fellowship, and a quarry operated by Boral Ltd. There is a relatively new housing development in the north west corner.

Education
There is one primary school in the area named Lysterfield Primary School (situated in Bellfield Drive, Lysterfield). However, the suburb is close to many primary and secondary schools in neighbouring suburbs.

See also
 Shire of Sherbrooke – Lysterfield was previously within this former local government area.

References

Suburbs of Melbourne
Suburbs of Yarra Ranges
Suburbs of the City of Knox